Domenico Bruni  (c. 1600–1666) was an Italian painter of the Baroque period, mainly active in Brescia.

He trained with Tommaso Sandrino. He helped decorate the chorus of the church of the Carmini in Brescia in 1634.

References

1600s births
1666 deaths
17th-century Italian painters
Italian male painters
Painters from Brescia
Italian Baroque painters
Quadratura painters